Student housing owned by the University of California, Los Angeles is governed by two separate departments: the Office of Residential Life, and Housing and Hospitality Services, and provides housing for both undergraduates and graduate students, on and off-campus.

Undergraduate

UCLA's original residence hall was Hershey Hall, located on Hilgard Avenue in South Campus. It was named after Mira Hershey, who bequeathed $300,000 to have the all-women dorm built. The original Hershey Hall of the 1930s is still in use today as an academic building. However, the west wing that was added later was demolished to make way for the Terasaki Life Sciences Building. The men's wing, built in 1959, was located in the current site of Parking Garage 2.

Today, much of UCLA's undergraduate residential community is located on a ridge on the northwestern edge of the campus called “the Hill.” The Hill consists of residential complexes housing, dining halls, commons buildings containing student services, conference facilities, and classrooms; facilities for recreational and varsity sports; the Southern Regional Library; and Tom Bradley International Hall, which contains services for foreign students.

Additionally, UCLA owns a number of apartment buildings throughout Westwood known as the University Apartments, some reserved for graduate students but a number reserved for undergraduates.

Student life on the Hill is under the care of the Residential Life (ResLife), formerly called "Office of Residential Life (ORL)". Currently, incoming first-year students are guaranteed three years of on-campus housing and incoming transfer students are guaranteed one year of housing. The Housing Master Plan aims to guarantee housing to all undergraduates for four years by 2014.

Starting in 2009, the Hill underwent the Northwest Campus In-fill Project, which added an additional 1,525 beds, 10 faculty in-residence apartments, a 750-seat dining hall, and four residential towers.  Two of these buildings, Holly Ridge and Gardenia Way, which are part of De Neve Plaza, opened February 2012. The other two, Sproul Cove and Sproul Landing, were completed in September 2013. Sproul Cove stands on the previously-unoccupied ridge below Rieber Hall. Sproul Landing stands on the former site of the Office of Residential Life, which has relocated to Tom Bradley International Hall.

In 2021, UCLA completed the construction of two additional residence halls on the Hill, Olympic Hall and Centennial Hall, built on an empty ridge between the Saxon and Hitch suites. These new halls provide another 621 rooms and 1,800 new beds for the UCLA undergraduate population, a makerspace and a quick service takeout restaurant.

As of fall 2021, the capacity of the Hill stands at 14,500 students, and UCLA is attempting to guarantee 4 years of housing for freshmen undergraduates and 2 years for transfers by fall 2022.

Layout of the Hill
The Hill is divided into smaller complexes, each organized around a common open space and having its own student services, buffet-style dining halls, and quick-service restaurants, with students permitted to dine at any eatery on the Hill. The following is a listing of the communities, and the buildings located in them:

Centennial Hall 
Named in honor of UCLA's centennial in 2019, it was completed in 2021 and is the newest addition to the Hill's residence halls along with Olympic Hall. Both halls contain deluxe triple and deluxe double style housing.

De Neve Plaza

Named after Felipe de Neve, "founder of Los Angeles", De Neve Plaza consists of these buildings:

Acacia View
Birch Heights
Cedar Bluff
Dogwood Glen
Evergreen Pass
Fir Grove
Gardenia Way
Holly Ridge
De Neve Commons 
Front desk services, as well as classrooms and conference facilities, are located in De Neve Commons. Dining options within the complex include the De Neve Residential Restaurant, which is converted nightly to the quick-service options, De Neve Late Night and My Pizza and Wings.

Dykstra Hall
Built in 1959, Dykstra was the first dorm located on the Hill, as well as the first co-ed residence hall in the United States. The hall is named after UCLA Provost Clarence Dykstra. Though classified as its own separate building, it is considered part of De Neve Plaza for practical purposes, since it is adjacent to the De Neve buildings and physically connected to De Neve Commons (which also happens to be contiguous with Acacia View and Birch Heights). Also, front desk and mailroom services, recreational rooms, and the closest dining options for Dykstra residents are in De Neve Commons. Dykstra reopened for the 2013-2014 school year after a year of renovations.

Hedrick Court
Named after UCLA Provost Earle Raymond Hedrick 

Hedrick Hall 
Front desk and mailroom services, as well as recreation facilities, are in the ground floor of Hedrick Hall. The building's own dining option, "The Study at Hedrick", a takeout option connected to a 24-hour study lounge, is adjacent to the ground floor of Hedrick Hall. This building primarily houses 1st year students. 
Hedrick Summit
This building consists of nine floors and approximately 900 people. Amenities included within this complex include a TV lounge, recreation room, study lounges and controllable AC for every individual room. Hedrick Summit does not have its own dining option. Hedrick Summit typically houses 1st, 2nd or 3rd year undergraduates or 1st year transfer students. 
Hitch Suites
This all-suite complex consists of four low-rise buildings, lettered A-D. It is classified as an autonomous community, but is considered part of Hedrick Court for practical purposes. Front desk and mailroom services, as well as recreation rooms, are in the ground floor of Hedrick Hall. The closest dining options are located in Rieber Court. After a one-year renovation, Hitch was reopened for the 2014-2015 academic year. Hitch Suites primarily house 1st and 2nd year students along with 1st year transfers.

Olympic Hall 
Named in honor of the 2028 Summer Olympics to be held in Los Angeles for which UCLA will provide athlete housing, this building has 9 stories and aided in accomplishing UCLA's goal of providing 4 years of guaranteed housing to undergraduate students. It was completed in 2021 and is the newest addition to the Hill's residence halls along with Centennial Hall. Includes The Drey as a quick-service food option and has a Makerspace designed to encourage student creation. Rieber Hall acts as both Olympic and Centennial Hall's front desks.

Rieber Court
Named after Charles H. Rieber, first dean of the UCLA College of Letters and Science 
Rieber Hall 
Rieber Terrace
Rieber Vista
Front desk and mailroom services are on the ground floor of Rieber Hall. Dining facilities within the complex include the Asian cuisine inspired Feast at Rieber adjacent to the ground floor of Rieber Hall and the quick-service option Rendezvous adjacent to the ground floor of Rieber Terrace.
Saxon Suites
This all-suite complex consists of seven low-rise buildings, lettered E-K. It is classified as a separate community, but is considered part of Rieber Court for practical purposes, since front desk and mailroom services, recreation rooms, and the nearest dining options for Saxon residents are in Rieber Court.

Sproul Plaza
Named after UC President Robert Gordon Sproul

Sproul Hall 
Sproul Cove 
Sproul Landing 
Carnesale Commons (formerly Sproul Presidio) -- named after UCLA Chancellor Emeritus Albert Carnesale
Northwest Campus Auditorium
Front desk and mailroom services are in the lobby of Sproul Hall. The complex's main dining facility, Bruin Plate, is located in Carnesale Commons, which opened as Sproul Presidio but was later renamed after former UCLA chancellor Albert Carnesale in October 2013. A quick-service option, Bruin Café, is adjacent to the ground floor of Sproul Hall. Conference facilities are located in the Northwest Campus Auditorium, as well as Carnesale Commons. The complex also contains a gym known as the Bruin Fitness Center (BFit).

Sunset Village
Canyon Point
Courtside
Delta Terrace
Covel Commons -- named after UCLA physician and benefactor Mitchel Covel
Front desk and mailroom services, as well as classrooms and conference facilities, are located in Covel Commons. Dining facilities include the Epicuria, formerly the Covel Commons Residential Restaurant,  and quick-service option of Café 1919 adjacent to the ground floor of Delta Terrace. Canyon Point reopened following renovation during the 2013-2014 academic year. Canyon Point and Delta Terrace consist of solely "plaza shared" rooms, wherein two dorms (double or triple dorms) share a bathroom in a 'jack-and-jill' layout. Courtside, on the other hand, consists of only "plaza private" rooms, where 1 dorm (typically a double or triple) has one attached en suite bathroom. All 3 buildings are made up of 8 houses (each housing approximately 50-100 students). These 8 houses are semi-connected (for instance, all 8 houses in Courtside have separate entrances on the ground floor, but are uniformly connected on the second and third floors).

Next to Sunset Village is the Sunset Canyon Recreation Center, the primary sports complex on the hill, containing tennis courts, swimming pools, basketball courts, and volleyball courts for resident use.

Room types

There are three different living options for undergraduates, each providing different levels of social interaction, noise level, amenities, and privacy.

There are traditional high-rise Halls, with students grouped by floors, sharing a gender-specific bathroom with 40-50 others. Buildings of this sort include: Dykstra Hall, Hedrick Hall, Rieber Hall, and Sproul Hall. Recently, the Deluxe Residential Hall format has also been introduced, which has some features of the residential plaza, such as more spacious rooms and a thermostat in each room to control air-conditioning. This configuration is found in De Neve Gardenia Way, De Neve Holly Ridge, Sproul Cove, Centennial Hall, Olympic Hall, and Sproul Landing.

The second configuration is the Plaza, which has the same general amenities as the Halls, but has more spacious rooms, and has a private bathroom or shared bathroom with an adjacent room. The twelve plaza buildings include: Hedrick Summit, Rieber Terrace, Rieber Vista, all residential buildings in Sunset Village, and all residential buildings in De Neve Plaza except for Holly and Gardenia.

There are also Suites, which are standalone units supporting 4-6 students, with private bathroom and living space. The complex comprises several buildings sharing a laundry room and outdoor recreational amenities. This configuration is found in Hitch Suites and Saxon Suites.

Resident Assistants
Each floor or community on The Hill is overseen by one or two Residential Assistants (depending on the community size). These "RAs" are students staff who work to incorporate ResLife's "Core 5" Principles into the living environment. Typically, these RAs host "programs" (events) to encourage residents to meet each other, explore LA and be academically successful. Classic programs include visiting Santa Monica, going to the Ropes Course at Sunset Rec or getting free massages during midterms. These Resident Assistants go through an extensive and competitive interview and training process before getting the position.

In the University Apartments (which are overseen only by Housing and not ResLife), Apartment Coordinators are available to help students.

University apartments 
UCLA also owns and operates 13 apartment complexes around Westwood for upper-division undergraduate students. These include

 Gayley Court
 Gayley Heights
 Gayley Towers
 Glenrock & Glenrock West
 Landfair
 Landfair Vista
 Levering Terrace
 Westwood Chateau
 Westwood Palm
 Tipuana
 Palo Verde
 Laurel

With the completion of the construction of the most recent apartment complexes, UCLA now guarantees 4 years of undergraduate housing.

Graduate
Roughly 3,000 graduate students live in one of six UCLA-owned apartment complexes or communities. As of 2007, UCLA housed 26% of its graduate and professional students.

Hilgard House and Weyburn Terrace provide housing for single students. The other graduate units, located south of the 10 Freeway, provide family housing.

 Weyburn Terrace. In 2002, the university began constructing Phase 1 of Weyburn Terrace, a seven building apartment community with 1,387 beds, in order to recruit top graduate students from around the world. Previously, there had been no university-operated graduate housing on or near the main campus since the demolition of a graduate student-only dorm damaged by the 1994 Northridge earthquake. The project suffered numerous delays, but was fully completed before the Fall 2005 term. Weyburn Terrace enables UCLA to provide housing to approximately fifty percent of incoming graduate and professional students. It also served as housing for displaced Tulane University law students who visited at UCLA during the Fall semester following Hurricane Katrina. A limited number of units are available with furniture for an additional fee. The buildings in Weyburn Terrace are all named after trees: Aloe, Magnolia, Sycamore, Palm, Jacaranda, Cypress, and Olive.
 Hilgard Houses. Hilgard Houses apartments consist of two complexes located on the east edge of campus on Hilgard Avenue.  Each three-story building has a central courtyard, laundry room, and subterranean parking.  All 81 units are furnished studio apartments with full kitchens. The Hilgard Houses apartments are 100% smoke-free in order to maintain the indoor air quality and only non-smokers will be allowed to live there. The Hilgard Houses complex is for single students.
 University Village. University Village provides student community living for married students, same-sex domestic partners and single parents. Units consist of unfurnished one-, two- and three-bedrooms. It is reserved for family use.
 Rose Avenue Apartments. Rose Avenue has 93 unfurnished units, primarily two-bedroom, located across from the University Village complex. The complex was not built specifically to house families, but families may reside here.
 Keystone/Mentone. Keystone/Mentone, located in Palms, is a 244-unit complex contains one- and two-bedroom unfurnished apartments. The complex was not built specifically to house families, but families may reside here.
 Venice/Barry. The Venice/Barry apartments is a 140-unit building containing unfurnished junior one-bedroom, one-bedroom and two-bedroom apartments. The complex was not built specifically to house families, but families may reside here.

The complexes which permit families are zoned to the Los Angeles Unified School District.
The Keystone-Mentone complex is zoned to Palms Elementary School, Palms Middle School, and Hamilton High School.
Rose Avenue is zoned to Charnock Road Elementary School, Palms Middle School, and Venice High School. Rose Avenue had been rezoned from Hamilton to Venice in 2007.
University Village is zoned to Clover Elementary School, Webster Middle School, and Venice High School.
Venice-Barry is zoned to Grand View Elementary School, Webster Middle School, and Venice High School.

References

External links
 UCLA Housing Website

California Los Angeles, University of
Student housing
California Los Angeles, University of, student housing